Escalima is a genus of marine bivalve molluscs in the family Limidae, the file shells or file clams.

Species
 Escalima goughensis (Melvill & Standen, 1907)
 Escalima regularis Powell, 1955

References
 SealifeBase
 

Limidae
Bivalve genera